The 10th Virginia Regiment was raised on December 28, 1775, in western Virginia for service with the Continental Army. The regiment would see action at the Battle of Brandywine, Battle of Germantown, Battle of Monmouth and the Siege of Charleston. Most of the regiment was captured at Charlestown, South Carolina, on May 12, 1780, by the British and the regiment was formally disbanded on November 15, 1783.

References

External links
Bibliography of the Continental Army in Virginia compiled by the United States Army Center of Military History
10th VA Regiment History

10th Virginia Regiment